Yaudheya (Brahmi script: 𑀬𑁅𑀥𑁂𑀬) or Yoddheya Gana (Yoddheya Republic) was an ancient militant confederation based in the Eastern Punjab region. The word Yaudheya is a derivative of the word  from yodha meaning warriors. They were principally kshatriya renowned for their skills in warfare, as inscribed in the Junagadh rock inscription of Rudradaman and according to Pāṇini the suffix 'ya' is added to the names of warlike tribes.

Geography 
The Yaudheyas have been described as residing in the area between the Sutlej river and Ganges river with their southern border in modern day Rajasthan,  based on their numerous coin findings between these crosshairs. According to the Mahabharata, the Yaudheyan territory was named as Bahudhanyaka, stating that its capital was located in modern day Rohtak, this can also be attested by their coin inscriptions occasionally stating, 'Bahudhanakey Yaudheyanama', translating to 'of the Yaudheyas of the Bahudhanak land'. According to Alexander Cunningham, the Yaudheyas must have lied 'between Bhatner and Pakpattan to Sabzalkot and half way between Uch and Bhakarwara'.

Literature
Puranas (e.g. Brahmanda, Vayu, Brahma and Harivamsha) described Yaudheyas as the descendants of Uśīnara and Nrigu.

In the Mahabharata, the land Bahudhanyaka is stated to be among the countries subjugated by Nakula, the fourth Pandava. Bahudhanyaka was the first to fall to Nakulas conquest in of the western direction toward Sakastan, which agrees with the Rohtak-Hisar area.

They are mentioned in Pāṇini's Ashtadhyayi and Ganapatha.

History

Rise of the Republic 

The Yaudheyas emerged as an entity following the decline of the Kuru Kingdom (c. 1200 BCE–c. 525 BCE). The Yaudheyas would eventually encompass the land formerly belonging to the Kurus, including their former capitals Indraprastha, Hastinapur, and Āsandīvat. The Kuru Kingdom which was the prominent power in the Vedic age fell in importance when compared to the other Mahajanapadas.

The earliest references of the existence of the Yaudheyas is in Pāṇini's Ashtadhyayi (V.3.116-17 and IV.1.178) of (c.500 BCE) and the Ganapatha. In his works the Yaudheyas are mentioned as ayudha-jivin sanghas i.e., a community living by the profession of arms.

Mauryan Empire (c. 320 – 180 BCE) 
The Yaudheyas were incorporated into the Maurya Empire by Chandragupta Maurya. Chandragupta, under the tutelage of Chanakya, won over local kingdoms and republics in Punjab before conquering the Nanda Empire. His military, according to Thomas William Rhys Davids, consisted mainly of soliders from the Punjab Janapadas.

As recorded in the Bijayagadh pillar inscription commissioned around Ashokas reign, the Yaudheyas appointed a chief who held the title of Maharaja-Senapati. This chief of the Yaudheya republic was appointed the Mahasenapati or 'Great Commander of the Army' for the Mauryan military.

Conflicts with the Indo-Greeks (c. 130 BCE)
Yaudheyas mention military victories on their coins ("Victory of the Yaudheyas"), soon after the Maurya Empire, it is thought the Yaudheyas had become an independent kingdom at that point. In the 2nd century BCE the Yaudheyas are seen to of battled with the Indo-Greek Kingdom after the death of Menander I(c. 155-130 BCE) leading to them, in a coalition with the Arjunayanas, winning "victory by the sword" as a result of the conflict. This is proven in their coinage displaying the victory.

Confronting the Western Satraps
During the second century CE, the Yaudheyas confronted the Indo-Scythians but they were defeated by Rudradaman I, who according to his inscriptions, would not accept capitulation.According to Alexander Cunningham the territory of the Yaudheyas during this time must have extended far into the South, stating that the two would not have come into contact otherwise.He presumes that the victory of Rudradaman I was merely a plundering expedition and states that Rudradaman does not claim their dominion as part of his country.

The Junagadh rock inscription of Rudradaman(c. 150 CE) acknowledged the military might of the Yaudheyas "who would not submit  because they were proud of their title "heroes among the Kshatriyas"", although the inscription claims that they were ultimately vanquished by Rudradaman.

Conquering the Kushans

It is thought that the Kushans then became suzerains of the Yaudheyas when they endeavored to hold the Mathura area during the reign of Kanishka. An indication is the fact that the Kushan ruler Huvishka featured Maaseno on his coins, the Kushan incarnation of the Hindu god Karttikeya, or Skanda, whose epithet was "Mahasena". This god being particularly important to the Yaudheyas, it may have been incorporated into Kushan coinage when the Kushans expanded into Yaudheya territory.

In Kanishka's rock Rabatak inscription, he describes campaigning into "the realm of the kshatriyas" in India, which presumably includes the Yaudheya's territories. Furthermore, Kanishka refers to commissioning statue of various local Iranian and Indian deities, including the deity Mahasena or Mahaseno (Kartikeya) which was the chief deity of the Yaudheyas and was often depicted in their coinage.

In the early 3rd century CE after Kanishkas death, a union formed between the Yaudheyas, Kunindas and Arjunayanas to expel the Kushans, resulting in a Kushan defeat and with them being expelled out of Eastern Punjab, as stated by the historian Anant Sadashiv Altekar. This can also be confirmed through their coinage inscription stating 'Yaudheyanam jayamantra daramanam' boasting their military victory.

Feudatories of the Gupta Empire  (c. 360 CE)

 

The name of the Yaudheyas is later mentioned in the Allahabad pillar inscription of the Gupta Empire ruler Samudragupta, as submitting to his rule, however this would be done without a fight and according to Upinder Singh there is no specific mention of them providing troops, indicating loose ties. According to historian R. C. Majumdar, it is likely that Samudraguptas conquests in Āryāvarta and Dakshinapatha increased his reputation to such an extent that the frontier rulers and tribes submitted him without a fight. This period ultimately saw the disintegration of the republic.

Coinage
The Yaudheyas only utilized Brahmi script on their coins and seals.

Alexander Cunningham divided the Yaudheya coins into two distinctive kinds; the older and smaller class A coins dating from before the 1st century BCE, and the larger Class B coins from the 3rd century CE during the decline of the Indo-Scythian power.  Cunningham states that the later coins evidently copied from the Indo-Scythians money.

John Allan classified Yaudheya coins into six classes, while Vincent Arthur Smith previously gave three types. The classification used by Allen has been mostly followed by scholars till today.

Yaudheya coins were found in the ancient capital of Khokrakot (modern Rohtak), and Naurangabad.

Based on the early coins produced by the Yaudheyas, it can be safely said that Karttikeya was considered their Iṣṭa-devatā.

References

Further reading
 Dasgupta, K.K. A Tribal History of Ancient India: A Numismatic Approach, Calcutta, 1974.
 Lahiri, Bela Indigenous States of Northern India (Circa 200 B.C. - 320 A.D.), University of Calcutta, 1974.

Former confederations

Ancient Indian culture
Former republics